Khon Kaen Wittayayon School (Thai: โรงเรียนขอนแก่นวิทยายน) is a public school located in Khon Kaen Province, Thailand. It admits secondary students (mathayom 1–6, equivalent to grades 7–12). Founded in 1897 as a boys' school for Khon Kaen Province, it became the first coeducational school in Khon Kaen. The school's former names were "Khon Kaen (boys') School" and "That Wittayakhan Temple School". The school's first principal was Mr. Tub Chimma.

Campus 

The school occupies 22 rai 2 ngarn. It has eighteen buildings, eleven of which have classrooms. The oldest building, Building 1, dates from 1978, and is used by the Department of Science. Construction of Buildings 2 and 3 followed in 1980. These three buildings are the primary structures of the campus.

Building 7 was begun by the school board to celebrate the school's 100th anniversary, and it's the largest building in the school. Other classroom buildings are Buildings 4, 6, 8, and 9. Other buildings include the auditorium, library, agricultural building, public relations building, academic resources building, and the shrines.

School Emblem

Curriculum 
The school follows the national Curriculum of Basic Education as of BE 2562 (2019 AD). Grouped into 11 areas:

Lower-secondary 
Science Mathematics Technology and Environment
Premium Math / Premium Science
Platinum Classroom
Gold Classroom
Gifted English Program

Upper-secondary 
Science Mathematics Technology and Environment
Premium Math / Premium Science
Platinum Classroom:
Health Science
Engineering
Law and Politics
Programmer
Second Language Art
Third Language Art (Chinese/Japanese-Spanish)
Gold Classroom
English Program:
Language Program (English-Chinese-Japanese-German)
Science-Mathematics Program

Subjects are grouped in 9 areas: Science and Technology, Mathematics, Thai, Social Studies and Religion, Foreign Languages, Arts, Vocations, Physical and Health Education

Heads of School

Notable alumni 
Politicians:
 Pongsakorn Unnopporn, former Deputy Minister of Education
 Somsak Kiatsuranont, former Deputy Speaker of the House of Representatives, former Minister of Culture, former Minister of Justice
 Adisorn Piangked, former Deputy Minister of Education, former Minister for Science and Technology
 Sarit Suntimeataneedol, PhD, former Deputy Minister of Education
 Prasert Prakunsuksapun, Khon Kaen Senator.
 Police:
 Pol. Gen. Wasit Dechkunchon, former Deputy Director-General of Thailand's national police, former Deputy Minister of Interior, writer
 Pol. Gen. Wichian Pojphothisri, former Acting Commissioner-General of the Royal Thai Police
 Pol. Maj. Gen. Wachira Thongwiseth, former Deputy Commissioner-General of the 4th region of the Royal Thai Police
 Military personnel: 
 Gen. Jarupat Ruangsuwan, former Associate Commissioner of the Election Commission
 Gen. Maj. Sujarit Jirumpaikul, former Royal Thai Army Adviser
 Gen. Maj. Chawanitya Kanchanatecha, former Royal Thai Army Adviser
 Civil servants:
 Kwanchai Wasawong, former Deputy Secretary of the Ministry of Interior
 Somporn Klinpongsa, former Deputy Secretary of the Ministry of Interior
 Kawee Suppateera, former Governor of Khon Kaen Province, a former member of the House of Representatives
 Associate Professor Intarachai Horwijit, PhD, former Vice President of Khon Kaen University
Athletes:
 Thanakorn Srichapun, former Thai tennis player
 Budsababunn Prasaengkaew, former Thailand Volleyball player
 Entertainers:
 Tono Pakin (The Star 6), actor, singer
 Sitthichai Phapchompoo (Boy, AF 3), actor, singer
 Thanachad Toollayachad (Arthie), film actor
 Harin "Dim" Suthamjarad, lead singer of Tattoo Colour
 Rath Pikadpiaree, singer and guitar player of Tattoo Colour
 Aekkachai "Thong" Chodrungrojna, drum player of Tattoo Colour
 Thanabordee "Jump" Theerapongpakdee, bass player of Tattoo Colour
 Sudteerak "King" Bumrungyad, actor
 Media:
 Kitti Singhaput, news correspondent

References

 Buildings and structures in Khon Kaen province
 Schools in Thailand